Liselotte Michel (born 4 May 1939) is a Swiss alpine skier. She competed in three events at the 1960 Winter Olympics.

References

1939 births
Living people
Swiss female alpine skiers
Olympic alpine skiers of Switzerland
Alpine skiers at the 1960 Winter Olympics
Sportspeople from Bern